The thyroid pouch or thyroid diverticulum is the embryological structure of the second pharyngeal arch from which thyroid follicular cells derive.

It grows from the floor of the pharynx.

See also
 Diverticulum

References

Human head and neck
Embryology
Thyroid